O2, O-2, o2, O2, O2, O2− or O2+ may refer to:

Science and technology 

  or dioxygen, the common allotrope of the chemical element oxygen
 , the ion oxide
 , the ion superoxide
 , the ion dioxygenyl
 , doubly ionized oxygen
 O2, an EEG electrode site according to the 10–20 system
 SGI O2, a Unix workstation computer
 UOC O2, institutional repository of the Open University of Catalonia
 O2, the earliest defined spectral class for stars

Places 

 The O2, an entertainment district in London, England
 The O2 Arena, the arena within The O2
 O2 Arena (Prague) or Sazka Arena, an arena in Prague, Czech Republic
 O2 Centre, an indoor shopping and entertainment centre on Finchley Road, London, England
 O2 Residence, a part of the Jumeirah Lake Towers in Dubai, United Arab Emirates
 O2 World (Berlin), an indoor arena in Berlin, Germany
 O2 World (Hamburg), an indoor arena in Hamburg, Germany
 Otoyol 2, a motorway in Turkey called "O2"
 The O2 (Dublin), the former name of 3Arena
 Ring 2 (Aarhus), a road in Aarhus, Denmark, which appears as "O2" on signs
 Ring 2 (Copenhagen), a road in Copenhagen, Denmark, which appears as "O2" on signs

Arts, entertainment, and media

Film 
Oxygen (2021 film) or O2, an American-French survival thriller film in production
O2 (2020 film), an Estonian-Latvia-Lithuanian-Finnish historical spy thriller film
O2 (2022 film), an Indian Tamil language survival thriller film

Music

Albums
 O2 (FireHouse album) (2000) album of the rock band FireHouse
 O2 (O-Town album) (2002) album by American boy band O-Town
 O2 (Tonéx album) (2002) album by Gospel singer Tonéx
 O2: Avalon Remixed, a 2002 album by Avalon
 O2 (Son of Dave album), 2006 album by Son of Dave

Songs
 "O2", a song by Orange Range from Panic Fancy
 "O2", a 2002 song by Sleater-Kinney from One Beat
 "O2", a song by Suho from Self-Portrait

Other arts, entertainment, and media 
 Ö2, a radio service for Austria and South Tyrol
 O2, a character in Kirby 64: The Crystal Shards

Businesses and organisations 
 O2, trading name for Telefónica Europe, a European telecommunications provider
 O2 Store, a chain of retail stores owned and operated by Telefónica Europe, with regional subsidiaries:
 O2 (brand), Telefónica mobile network global brand name
 O2 (Ireland), merged into Three Ireland
 O2 (UK)
 O2 Czech Republic
 Telefónica Germany
 Telefónica Slovakia
 O2 Academy, a chain of music venues
 O2 Wireless USA or H2O Wireless, a prepaid wireless service by Locus Telecommunications
 O2TV, a Russian independent socially political TV channel

Vehicles and vessels 
 Cessna O-2 Skymaster, a military twin-engine light aircraft
 Douglas O-2, a military single-engine observation biplane
 O 2-class submarine, a class of submarines of the Royal Netherlands Navy
 Oldershaw O-2, a glider
 SP&S Class O-2, a 1910 steam locomotives class
 USS O-2 (SS-63), a 1918 United States O class submarine
 Orbital O2, a tidal power turbine in Orkney
 GNR Class O2, a class of British steam locomotives classified O2 by both the GNR and the LNER

Other uses 
 O-2, a pay grade in the US uniformed services
 First lieutenant (United States) in the Army, Marine Corps, Air Force, and Space Force
 Lieutenant (junior grade) in the Navy, Coast Guard, Public Health Service Commissioned Corps, and NOAA Commissioned Officer Corps

See also 
 02 (disambiguation)
 Oz (disambiguation)
 2O (disambiguation)
 2Q (disambiguation) 
 Q2 (disambiguation)